Caladenia cracens, commonly known as the elegant caladenia, is a plant in the orchid family Orchidaceae and is endemic to Tasmania.

Description
Caladenia cracens is a terrestrial, perennial, deciduous, herb with an underground tuber and which grows singly or in loose groups.

The sepals and petals are glabrous on the front but densely covered with glandular hairs on the back and are held more or less horizontally and spreading from each other. There are between two and four irregular rows of thin cream or yellow calli along the centre part. The lateral lobes of the labellum are erect and partly surround the column. Flowering occurs between late September and early November and is followed by the fruit which is a papery capsule.

Taxonomy and naming
Caladenia cracens was first formally described by David L. Jones in 1996 and the description was published in Muelleria from a specimen collected in the Lenah Valley near Hobart. The specific epithet (cracens) is a Latin word meaning "neat" or "graceful", adjectives "which apply to this graceful species".

Distribution and habitat
Elegant caladenia is widespread in southern Tasmania where it grows in woodland and forest, less commonly in heath.

References

cracens
Plants described in 1996
Endemic orchids of Australia
Orchids of Tasmania
Taxa named by David L. Jones (botanist)